Ratnasekera Ralahamilage Dias Bandaranayake was a Ceylonese politician. He was the member of Parliament of Sri Lanka from Gampola  representing the Sri Lanka Freedom Party in 1960. He unsuccessfully contested the July 1960 Ceylonese parliamentary election and the 1965 Ceylonese parliamentary election

References

Members of the 4th Parliament of Ceylon
Sri Lanka Freedom Party politicians
Sinhalese politicians

Date of death missing
Year of death missing